Dodge Macknight (né William Dodge MacKnight; 1 October 1860 Providence, Rhode Island – 23 May 1950 East Sandwich, Massachusetts) was an American painter.

Career 
MacKnight's work falls under the post-Impressionism, an art movement that succeeded the nineteenth-century impressionism. McKnight made the major part of his career watercolors. His colorful works were appreciated by amateurs in Boston, who were receptive to impressionist aesthetics. He painted mostly landscapes and was considered as the equal of John Singer Sargent.

MacKnight lived in Fontvieille at the time when Vincent van Gogh was living in Arles. In 1888, they met through John Russell. MacKnight became a friend of van Gogh, and introduced him to the Belgian painter Eugène Boch. Russell portrayed both van Gogh and MacKnight.

The largest collections of MacKnight's works are at the Isabella Stewart Gardner Museum, Boston. The Museum of Fine Arts (Boston) and the Fogg Art Museum in Cambridge (Massachusetts) also have a collection of his paintings.

References

External links
 
 The Free Library

1860 births
1950 deaths
19th-century American painters
American male painters
20th-century American painters
19th-century American male artists
20th-century American male artists